Huntsville is an unincorporated community in Fall Creek Township, Madison County, Indiana.

History
Huntsville was laid out in 1830. It was named for one of its founders, Eleazer Hunt. A post office was established at Huntsville in 1847, and remained in operation until it was discontinued in 1878.

Geography

References

Unincorporated communities in Madison County, Indiana
Unincorporated communities in Indiana
Indianapolis metropolitan area
1830 establishments in Indiana